The Fisherman's Diary is a 2020 Cameroonian drama film directed by Enah Johnscott. The film premiered at the 2020 I Will Tell International Film Festival. It was selected as the Cameroonian entry for the Best International Feature Film at the 93rd Academy Awards, but it was not nominated. The film was nominated for Best Feature Film at the 2020 Paris Art and Movie Awards.

Cast
 Cosson Chinopoh
 Kang Quintus
 Faith Fidel
 Ndamo Damarise 
 Onyama Laura
 Prince Sube Mayorchu
 Godwill Neba
 Ramsey Nouah

See also
 List of submissions to the 93rd Academy Awards for Best International Feature Film
 List of Cameroonian submissions for the Academy Award for Best International Feature Film

References

External links
 

2020 films
2020 drama films
Cameroonian drama films